Robert Parker (born 18 September 1942) is an Australian cricketer. He played in twenty-five first-class matches for Queensland between 1967 and 1972.

See also
 List of Queensland first-class cricketers

References

External links
 

1942 births
Living people
Australian cricketers
Queensland cricketers
Cricketers from Toowoomba